Rivera v. Illinois, 556 U.S. 148 (2009), is a decision by the United States Supreme Court involving whether the rejection of a defendant's peremptory challenge to a juror constituted harmless error.

Background of the case 
Michael Rivera was convicted of two counts of first degree murder in 1998.  He was then sentenced to eighty-five years in prison.  During the pre-trial voir dire, Rivera's counsel used a peremptory challenge to have a juror removed from consideration.  The judge deemed the challenge to be based on discriminatory factors and allowed the juror to be seated.

Rivera appealed, arguing that the trial judge erred in dismissing the peremptory challenge.  The Illinois Supreme Court remanded the case for the trial court to explain why the peremptory challenge in question was discriminatory.  The trial judge submitted gender discrimination as the relevant discriminatory factor.

Unsatisfied with this explanation, the Illinois Supreme Court held that Rivera was wrongly denied his challenge to dismiss the juror.  The state supreme court found no evidence that Rivera's attorney used discriminatory considerations in arguing for the dismissal of the juror in question.  Despite this, the state supreme court decided that such a mistake constituted a harmless error.

U.S. Supreme Court Ruling 
James K. Leven argued the case for the petitioner.  Michael A. Scodro argued the case for the respondent.  Assistant to the Solicitor General Matthew D. Roberts argued the case for the United States, as amicus curiae, in support of the respondent.

The U.S. Supreme Court affirmed the Illinois Supreme Court decision in a unanimous opinion.

See also 
 List of United States Supreme Court cases, volume 556
List of United States Supreme Court cases

References

External links
 
Oral arguments transcript

Batson challenge case law
United States Sixth Amendment jury case law
United States Supreme Court cases
United States Supreme Court cases of the Roberts Court
2009 in United States case law